The 1936 United States presidential election in Utah took place on November 3, 1936 as part of the 1936 United States presidential election. All contemporary forty-eight states took part in the national election, and Utah voters selected four voters to the Electoral College, who voted for president and vice president.

Background
Since its landslide endorsement of William Jennings Bryan's "free silver" in its inaugural 1896 election, Utah had been a swing state apart from its support for embattled President William Howard Taft in 1912. Woodrow Wilson had carried the state easily in 1916 due to strong anti-war sentiment, but James M. Cox, John W. Davis and Robert M. La Follette did not win a single county between them in the 1920 and 1924 Republican landslides.

Vis-à-vis the rest of the nation, the Beehive State had shown only a small anti-Hoover trend in 1932. During Landon's summer campaigning, Utah was targeted strongly as a state the GOP needed to carry to have a chance at the presidency. However, FDR's western public works programs, most notably Boulder Dam, had made him exceptionally popular in the rugged, arid West. Along with the potent campaigning of James Farley meant that, by the last week of October the Republicans were showing no interest in the Beehive State, and this despite the opposition of the leadership of Utah's dominant Church of Jesus Christ of Latter-day Saints to Roosevelt's candidacy and policies, chiefly regarding the church's desire to remove Mormons from welfare rolls.

Vote
Utah, like every other state west of the Appalachian Mountains, voted for Franklin D. Roosevelt over Alf Landon by a substantial margin, making FDR the first (and only) Democrat to win the state more than once. Roosevelt won Utah by a landslide with 69.34 percent of the vote, which remains the second best Democratic result from the state behind William Jennings Bryan in the state's inaugural election of 1896.

Like Bryan, FDR won every county in the state except strongly Republican Kane County in the far south, which has only voted Democrat for Woodrow Wilson in 1916. Kane County was the westernmost county in the nation to vote for Landon, and one of only three west of the Continental Divide to do so.

, this is the last election in which Iron County, Sanpete County, Sevier County, San Juan County, and Garfield County have voted for a Democratic presidential candidate.

Results

Results by county

See also
 United States presidential elections in Utah

Notes

References

Utah
1936